Stephen Henry (in French, Étienne Henri, in Medieval French, Estienne Henri;  – 19 May 1102) was the Count of Blois and Count of Chartres. He led an army during the First Crusade, was at the surrender of the city of Nicaea, and directed the siege of Antioch. Returning home without fulfilling his crusader vows, Stephen joined the crusade of 1101. Making his way to Jerusalem, he fought in the Second Battle of Ramla, where he was captured and later executed.

Life
Stephen was the son of Theobald III, count of Blois, and Gersent of Le Mans. He is first mentioned as approaching William the Conqueror to ask for and receive the hand of his daughter Adela of Normandy.  In 1089, upon the death of his father, Stephen became the Count of Blois and Chartres, although Theobald had given him the administration of those holdings in 1074.

Stephen was one of the leaders of the First Crusade, leading one of the major armies of the crusade and often writing enthusiastic letters to his wife about the crusade's progress. Present at the Siege of Nicaea, he asserts, in his letter, the surrender of the city to fear of siege towers. 

At some point either before or at the beginning of the Siege of Antioch in October 1098, he was chosen as 'leader' of the army, a function that seems to not have gone much beyond presiding over the assemblies of the leaders as well as provisioning and housekeeping duties for the armies.
Stephen retreated from the siege on 2 June 1098, the day before the capture of the city, leaving his comrades behind in a difficult situation as a superior Turkish army under Kerbogha was approaching. Critically, on the way back to the West he met the Byzantine emperor Alexios who was marching with an army to assist the crusaders and persuaded him of the futility of his expedition. 

Alexios consequent decision to turn around contributed to the ongoing suspicion of the crusaders that the Byzantines were not to be trusted and to the later conflicts between crusaders and Byzantium. Having returned without having fulfilled his vows and abandoned his comrades, Stephen returned in disgrace. He was pressured by Adela into making a second pilgrimage, and joined the subsequent Crusade of 1101 in the company of others who had also returned home prematurely. 

He participated in the failed campaign in Anatolia to free Bohemond from prison which ended in disaster and then sailed from Constantinople to St Simeon from whence he went to Jerusalem, finally fulfilling his vows. In 1102, already on his way back home, he was persuaded by the king of Jerusalem, Baldwin, to fight in the Second Battle of Ramla against the Fatimids. He was taken prisoner and executed, probably in Ascalon on 19 May.

Family
Stephen married Adela of Normandy, a daughter of William the Conqueror, around 1090 in Chartres. Their children were:
 William, Count of Sully
 Theobald II, Count of Blois
 Odo, who died young
 Stephen, King of England
 Lucia-Mahaut, married Richard d'Avranches, 2nd Earl of Chester. Both drowned on 25 November 1120 in the White Ship disaster.
 Agnes, married Hugh III of Le Puiset
Eleanor (died 1147) married Ralph I, Count of Vermandois; they were divorced in 1142.
 Alix (c. 1095 – 1145) married Renaud III of Joigni (d. 1134) and had issue
 Adelaide, married Milo II of Montlhéry, Viscount of Troyes (divorced 1115)
 Henry, Bishop of Winchester (c. 1096 – 1171)
 Humbert, died young

A late 14th century source gives Stephen an illegitimate daughter Emma, wife of Herbert of Winchester and mother of William of York, archbishop of York, but recent research suggests a different parentage for her.

References

Sources

|-
|width="30%" align="center"|Preceded by:Theobald III
|width="40%" align="center"|Count of Blois1089–1102	 
|width="30%" align="center"|Succeeded by:William the Simple

1040s births
1102 deaths

Year of birth uncertain
Counts of Blois
Counts of Chartres
Christians of the First Crusade
Christians of the Crusade of 1101
Military personnel killed in action
House of Blois